The 2004–05 Pittsburgh Penguins season  was the franchise's 38th season in the National Hockey League. However, due to the 2004–05 NHL lockout, no games were played.

Schedule
The Penguins regular season schedule was announced on July 14, 2004. Their preseason schedule was released on August 6, 2004, with two changes announced five days later.

|-
| 1 || September 25 || Boston Bruins
|-
| 2 || September 26 || Minnesota Wild
|-
| 3 || September 28 || @ Ottawa Senators
|-
| 4 || September 30 || Ottawa Senators
|-
| 5 || October 1 || @ Minnesota Wild
|-
| 6 || October 2 || Washington Capitals
|-
| 7 || October 6 || @ Washington Capitals
|-
| 8 || October 8 || @ Columbus Blue Jackets
|-
| 9 || October 9 || Columbus Blue Jackets
|-

|-
| 1 || October 15 || @ New York Rangers
|-
| 2 || October 16 || New York Rangers
|-
| 3 || October 19 || @ Montreal Canadiens
|-
| 4 || October 23 || @ Florida Panthers
|-
| 5 || October 26 || San Jose Sharks
|-
| 6 || October 29 || New York Rangers
|-
| 7 || October 30 || @ Buffalo Sabres
|-
| 8 || November 5 || @ Anaheim Mighty Ducks
|-
| 9 || November 6 || @ Los Angeles Kings
|-
| 10 || November 8 || @ Colorado Avalanche
|-
| 11 || November 11 || Edmonton Oilers
|-
| 12 || November 13 || Philadelphia Flyers
|-
| 13 || November 15 || Phoenix Coyotes
|-
| 14 || November 17 || Montreal Canadiens
|-
| 15 || November 18 || @ Washington Capitals
|-
| 16 || November 20 || @ New Jersey Devils
|-
| 17 || November 22 || New Jersey Devils
|-
| 18 || November 24 || Ottawa Senators
|-
| 19 || November 26 || @ New York Islanders
|-
| 20 || November 28 || @ New York Rangers
|-
| 21 || November 29 || Florida Panthers
|-
| 22 || December 3 || @ Carolina Hurricanes
|-
| 23 || December 4 || Detroit Red Wings
|-
| 24 || December 7 || Ottawa Senators
|-
| 25 || December 9 || St. Louis Blues
|-
| 26 || December 11 || New York Islanders
|-
| 27 || December 14 || Vancouver Canucks
|-
| 28 || December 16 || @ St. Louis Blues
|-
| 29 || December 18 || @ Minnesota Wild
|-
| 30 || December 21 || Washington Capitals
|-
| 31 || December 23 || Philadelphia Flyers
|-
| 32 || December 26 || @ Columbus Blue Jackets
|-
| 33 || December 28 || Buffalo Sabres
|-
| 34 || December 31 || Boston Bruins
|-
| 35 || January 1 || @ Washington Capitals
|-
| 36 || January 4 || @ Montreal Canadiens
|-
| 37 || January 7 || Chicago Blackhawks
|-
| 38 || January 8 || @ Ottawa Senators
|-
| 39 || January 11 || @ Toronto Maple Leafs
|-
| 40 || January 14 || New York Islanders
|-
| 41 || January 15 || @ New York Rangers
|-
| 42 || January 17 || Calgary Flames
|-
| 43 || January 19 || @ Atlanta Thrashers
|-
| 44 || January 20 || @ Philadelphia Flyers
|-
| 45 || January 22 || Tampa Bay Lightning
|-
| 46 || January 25 || @ Ottawa Senators
|-
| 47 || January 26 || Carolina Hurricanes
|-
| 48 || January 28 || @ Florida Panthers
|-
| 49 || January 30 || @ Tampa Bay Lightning
|-
| 50 || February 2 || Columbus Blue Jackets
|-
| 51 || February 4 || Washington Capitals
|-
| 52 || February 5 || @ Buffalo Sabres
|-
| 53 || February 9 || Florida Panthers
|-
| 54 || February 10 || @ Toronto Maple Leafs
|-
| 55 || February 15 || @ New Jersey Devils
|-
| 56 || February 18 || @ Carolina Hurricanes
|-
| 57 || February 19 || Atlanta Thrashers
|-
| 58 || February 21 || @ New York Islanders
|-
| 59 || February 24 || @ Philadelphia Flyers
|-
| 60 || February 26 || New York Rangers
|-
| 61 || February 27 || Montreal Canadiens
|-
| 62 || March 1 || Atlanta Thrashers
|-
| 63 || March 4 || New York Islanders
|-
| 64 || March 5 || @ Detroit Red Wings
|-
| 65 || March 8 || Tampa Bay Lightning
|-
| 66 || March 10 || @ Boston Bruins
|-
| 67 || March 12 || @ Philadelphia Flyers
|-
| 68 || March 13 || Toronto Maple Leafs
|-
| 69 || March 16 || @ Dallas Stars
|-
| 70 || March 18 || @ Tampa Bay Lightning
|-
| 71 || March 19 || @ Atlanta Thrashers
|-
| 72 || March 22 || @ Nashville Predators
|-
| 73 || March 24 || New Jersey Devils
|-
| 74 || March 26 || Carolina Hurricanes
|-
| 75 || March 27 || @ New Jersey Devils
|-
| 76 || March 29 || @ New York Islanders
|-
| 77 || March 31 || Buffalo Sabres
|-
| 78 || April 2 || Philadelphia Flyers
|-
| 79 || April 3 || Toronto Maple Leafs
|-
| 80 || April 7 || @ Boston Bruins
|-
| 81 || April 8 || New Jersey Devils
|-
| 82 || April 10 || Boston Bruins
|-

Transactions
The Penguins were involved in the following transactions from June 8, 2004, the day after the deciding game of the 2004 Stanley Cup Finals, through February 16, 2005, the day the  season was officially cancelled.

Trades
The Penguins did not make any trades.

Players acquired

Players lost

Signings

Draft picks
The 2004 NHL Entry Draft was held on June 26 at the RBC Center in Raleigh, North Carolina. The Penguins selected future Calder Memorial Trophy winner Evgeni Malkin with the second overall selection. 

Draft notes
 The Vancouver Canucks' second-round pick went to the Pittsburgh Penguins as a result of an August 25, 2003 trade that sent Johan Hedberg to the Canucks in exchange for this pick.
 The Calgary Flames' third-round pick went to the Pittsburgh Penguins as a result of a February 9, 2003 trade that sent Andrew Ference to the Flames in exchange for this conditional pick.
 The Vancouver Canucks' seventh-round pick went to the Pittsburgh Penguins as a result of a March 9, 2004 trade that sent Marc Bergevin to the Canucks in exchange for this pick.

Farm teams
The American Hockey League (AHL)'s Wilkes-Barre/Scranton Penguins finished fourth in the East Division with a record of 40–30–7–3. They defeated the Binghamton Senators in the first round of the playoffs before losing in the second round to the eventual Calder Cup champion Philadelphia Phantoms.

The ECHL's Wheeling Nailers finished out of the playoffs in sixth in the North Division with a 38–25–9 record.

Notes

References

Pitts
Pitts
Pittsburgh Penguins seasons
Pitts
Pitts